Radúz Dorňák (born 1 March 1956) is a former football player from Slovakia and recently manager of Myjava.

References

External links
 Spartak Myjava profile
 AS Trenčín profile

1956 births
Living people
Slovak footballers
Slovak football managers
AS Trenčín managers
Spartak Myjava managers
Association footballers not categorized by position